The Twentieth Amendment may refer to the:

Twentieth Amendment to the United States Constitution (1933), established some details of presidential succession and of the beginning and ending of the terms of elected federal officials
Twentieth Amendment of the Constitution of Ireland (1999), provided constitutional recognition of local government
Twentieth Amendment to the Constitution of Pakistan (2012)
Twentieth Amendment to the Constitution of Sri Lanka (2020)